Ysgol y Gader was a bilingual comprehensive school for pupils aged 11–16 that served the town of Dolgellau and the surrounding area in South Meirionnydd.

The school was categorised by the Welsh Government as a 'Bilingual 2CH' secondary school, meaning that all subjects, except Welsh and English, were taught to all pupils using both languages. According to the lates Estyn inspection report conducted in 2015, 29% of pupils came from homes in which Welsh is the main language, with 94% of pupils being able to speak Welsh to first language standard.

Ysgol y Gader closed on 7 September, 2017 and was replaced by a 3-16 all-through school - Ysgol Bro Idris.

References

Secondary schools in Gwynedd
Educational institutions established in 1962
1962 establishments in Wales
Educational institutions disestablished in 2017
2017 disestablishments in Wales